The 2004 NCAA Division I men's lacrosse tournament was the 34th annual Division I NCAA Men's Lacrosse Championship tournament. Sixteen NCAA Division I college men's lacrosse teams met after having played their way through a regular season, and for some, a conference tournament.

The championship game was played at M&T Bank Stadium in Baltimore, Maryland in front of 43,898 fans, Syracuse University won the championship title with a 14–13 win over United States Naval Academy. The Orange, led by senior Michael Powell who scored the game winner with one minute left in the fourth quarter, won their eighth NCAA championship game. Powell finished the game with one goal and five assists. Syracuse outscored Navy 3–1 in the final five minutes to overcome a 12-11 fourth-quarter deficit. Navy got the ball back with 15 seconds left, but could not get a shot off.

Tournament results 

 * = Overtime

Tournament notes 

 With Syracuse's 2004 national championship win Michael Powell joins his brothers Casey and Ryan as the first set of brothers to win a national championship with the same school.

See also
2004 NCAA Division I Women's Lacrosse Championship
2004 NCAA Division II Men's Lacrosse Championship
2004 NCAA Division III Men's Lacrosse Championship

References

External links 
Navy Falls to Syracuse in NCAA Championship Game 
YouTube 2004 NCAA Men's Lacrosse National Championship

NCAA Division I Men's Lacrosse Championship
NCAA Division I Men's Lacrosse Championship
NCAA Division I Men's Lacrosse Championship
NCAA Division I Men's Lacrosse Championship